The Michigan Wolverines wrestling team is an NCAA Division I Wrestling team competing as members of the Big Ten Conference.  The team is coached by Sean Bormet, a two-time All-American at Michigan.

Coaching Staff
As of December 27, 2022.

Coaching

Head coach history

National championships

Individual Championships
Michigan wrestlers have combined to win 24 individual NCAA championships.

Awards and honors

Coaching
NWCA Coach of the Year
Sean Bormet (2022)

Big Ten Coach of the Year
Sean Bormet (2022)

Notable Michigan Wolverine wrestlers

 Myles Amine – Olympic bronze medalist in freestyle wrestling at 2020 Summer Olympics representing San Marino, five-time NCAA All-American
 Rick Bay – two-time Big Ten Champion, served as head wrestling coach for Michigan (1970–74), and was later a college athletic director and professional sports executive
 Ryan Bertin – two-time NCAA Champion and four-time All-American
 Mark Churella – three-time NCAA Champion, qualified for 1980 Summer Olympics
 Dennis Fitzgerald – two-time Big Ten Champion, gold medalist for USA at 1963 Pan American Games, was also a Michigan football player along with being a college and NFL coach
 Ed Don George – Olympian in freestyle wrestling at 1928 Summer Olympics, later was a professional wrestler
 John Greene – Big Ten runner-up, also played football at Michigan, going on to play seven seasons in the NFL as a wide receiver for the Detroit Lions
 Robert Hewitt – Olympian in freestyle wrestling at 1928 Summer Olympics, two-time NCAA finalist
 Andy Hrovat – Olympian in freestyle wrestling at 2008 Summer Olympics, three-time NCAA All-American
 Mark Johnson – qualified for the 1980 U.S. Olympic Team in Greco-Roman wrestling, two-time NCAA finalist
 Harold Nichols – NCAA Champion, won six NCAA team championships as head coach at Iowa State
 Stevan Mićić – Olympian at 2020 Summer Olympics in freestyle wrestling representing Serbia, NCAA finalist and three-time All-American
 Alec Pantaleo – 2022 U.S. Open National Champion in freestyle wrestling, three-time NCAA All-American
 Dave Porter – two-time NCAA Champion and three-time All-American, also played football at Michigan lettering twice as a defensive tackle
 Nick Suriano – NCAA Champion and Big 10 Champion at Michigan

References